The imaginary unit or unit imaginary number is a solution to the quadratic equation . Although there is no real number with this property,  can be used to extend the real numbers to what are called complex numbers, using addition and multiplication.

Imaginary numbers are an important mathematical concept; they extend the real number system  to the complex number system , in which at least one root for every nonconstant polynomial exists (see Algebraic closure and Fundamental theorem of algebra). Here, the term "imaginary" is used because there is no real number having a negative square.

In contexts in which use of the letter  is ambiguous or problematic, the letter  is sometimes used instead.

Definition

The imaginary number  is defined solely by the property that its square is −1:

Although the construction is called "imaginary", and although the concept of an imaginary number may be intuitively more difficult to grasp than that of a real number, the construction is valid from a mathematical standpoint.

 or, equivalently, 

Similarly, as with any non-zero real number:

In the complex plane (also known as the Argand plane), which is a special interpretation of a Cartesian plane,  is the point located one unit from the origin along the imaginary axis (which is orthogonal to the real axis).

i vs. −i
 
Being a quadratic polynomial with no multiple root, the defining equation  has two distinct solutions, which are equally valid and which happen to be additive and multiplicative inverses of each other.

The issue can be a subtle one. One way of articulating the situation is that although the complex field is unique (as an extension of the real numbers) up to isomorphism, it is not unique up to a unique isomorphism. Indeed, there are two field automorphisms of  that keep each real number fixed, namely the identity and complex conjugation.  For more on this general phenomenon, see Galois group.

Matrices

Using the concepts of matrices  and matrix multiplication, imaginary units can be represented in linear algebra. A typical choice is

More generally, a real-valued  matrix  satisfies  if and only if  has a matrix trace of zero and a matrix determinant of one, so  can be chosen to be

whenever .

Matrices larger than  can be used.  For example,  could be chosen to be the  identity matrix with  chosen to be any of the three  Dirac matrices for spatial dimensions, .

For example,

Proper use
The imaginary unit is sometimes written  in advanced mathematics contexts (as well as in less advanced popular texts). However, great care needs to be taken when manipulating formulas involving radicals. The radical sign notation is reserved either for the principal square root function, which is only defined for real , or for the principal branch of the complex square root function. Attempting to apply the calculation rules of the principal (real) square root function to manipulate the principal branch of the complex square root function can produce false results:

Similarly:

Generally, the calculation rules

and

For a more thorough discussion, see square root and branch point.

Properties

Square roots 

Just like all nonzero complex numbers,  has two square roots: they are

Indeed, squaring both expressions yields:

Using the radical sign for the principal square root, we get:

Cube roots 

 and

Multiplication and division 
Multiplying a complex number by  gives:

(This is equivalent to a 90° counter-clockwise rotation of a vector about the origin in the complex plane.)

(This is equivalent to a 90° clockwise rotation of a vector about the origin in the complex plane.)

Powers 
The powers of  repeat in a cycle expressible with the following pattern, where  is any integer:

This leads to the conclusion that

where mod represents the modulo operation.  Equivalently:

raised to the power of  
Making use of Euler's formula,  has infinitely many values

for any integer .

Factorial 
The factorial of the imaginary unit  is most often given in terms of the gamma function evaluated at :

The magnitude of this number is

while its argument is

Other operations 
The following functions are well-defined, single-valued functions when  is a positive real number.

A number raised to the  power is:

The  root of a number is:

which is a real number when  is a real number.

which is a purely imaginary number when  is a real number.

In contrast, many functions involving , including those that depend upon  or the logarithm of another complex number, are complex multi-valued functions, with different values on different branches of the Riemann surface the function is defined on. For example, if one chooses any branch where  then one can write

when  is a positive real number.  When  is not a positive real number in the above formulas then one must precisely specify the branch to get a single-valued function; see complex logarithm.

History

Designating square roots of negative numbers as "imaginary" is generally credited to René Descartes, and Isaac Newton used the term as early as 1670. The  notation was introduced by Leonhard Euler.

See also
Euler's identity
Mathematical constant
Multiplicity (mathematics)
Root of unity
Unit complex number

Notes

References

Further reading

External links
  at 

Complex numbers
Algebraic numbers
Quadratic irrational numbers
Mathematical constants